This list of tallest buildings in Baoding ranks skyscrapers in Baoding, Hebei, China by height. The aforementioned building is also the tallest in Hebei province.

Baoding is a prefecture-level city located in central Hebei province. Situated immediately southwest of Beijing, it once served as the capital of Hebei province and is now one of core cities that comprises the Jing-Jin-Ji Metropolitan Region. Recently, the city saw new developments, primarily the Xiong'an New Area, which was established in 2017 following the success of Shenzhen Special Economic Zone and Pudong New Area in Shanghai.

The city ranks 64th in China by numbers of completed 150 m+ (492 ft+) buildings.

Tallest Completed Buildings

References

Baoding
Skyscrapers in Hebei